Erland Ellingsen (27 September 1900 – 17 January 1973) was a Norwegian footballer. He played in one match for the Norway national football team in 1922.

References

External links
 
 

1900 births
1973 deaths
Norwegian footballers
Norway international footballers
Sportspeople from Drammen
Association football forwards